Nutting's flycatcher (Myiarchus nuttingi) is a passerine bird in the tyrant flycatcher family. It breeds in semi-arid desert scrub and tropical deciduous forest from western Mexico to northwest Costa Rica. It is normally a year-round resident, but has been known as an occasional vagrant to southern California and Arizona–(southeastern, central, and western), in the United States.  It is named for the zoologist Charles Cleveland Nutting.

Nutting's flycatchers build their nests in a tree cavity or similar natural or man-made hole, and the normal clutch is three to five eggs.

Adult Nutting's flycatchers are 18–19 cm long and weigh 21-23 g. The upper parts are olive brown, with a darker head and short crest. The breast is gray, and the belly is a softly-colored yellow. The brown tail feathers are extensively rufous, the wings have rufous outer webs, and there are two dull wing bars. The sexes' markings are similar.

A Nutting's flycatcher may be distinguished from other very similar Myiarchus species by its call, a sharp .

Although this species is primarily an insectivore, catching flies in undergrowth, it will also eat berries.

References

Nutting's flycatcher
Birds of Mexico
Birds of Central America
Nutting's flycatcher
Taxa named by Robert Ridgway